The 1999–2000 Karnataka State Film Awards, presented by Government of Karnataka, to felicitate the best of Kannada Cinema released in the year 1999.

Lifetime achievement award

Jury 
A committee headed by Jayamala was appointed to evaluate the feature films awards.

Film Awards

Other Awards

References

Karnataka State Film Awards